is a former Japanese football player.

Playing career
Ishikawa was born in Uruma on February 6, 1970. After graduating from Okinawa International University, he joined Nagoya Grampus Eight in 1992. However he did not play as much as teammates Dido Havenaar and Yuji Ito. In 1996, he moved to the Japan Football League club Brummell Sendai (later Vegalta Sendai). He became a regular goalkeeper and the club was promoted to the J2 League in 1999. However he lost his regular position to Norio Takahashi. In 2001, he moved to Mito HollyHock and he played often over two seasons. In 2003, he moved to JEF United Ichihara. However he did not play as much as teammate Ryo Kushino and retired at the end of the 2003 season.

Coaching career
After retirement, Ishikawa became a goalkeeper coach for JEF United Ichihara (later JEF United Chiba) in 2004. In 2007, he moved to Rissho University and became a manager. In 2009, he moved to his old club Nagoya Grampus and became a goalkeeper coach for the youth team. In 2016, he moved to Avispa Fukuoka and became a goalkeeper coach. He resigned at the end of 2016.

Club statistics

References

External links

1970 births
Living people
Okinawa International University alumni
Association football people from Okinawa Prefecture
Japanese footballers
J1 League players
J2 League players
Japan Football League (1992–1998) players
Nagoya Grampus players
Vegalta Sendai players
Mito HollyHock players
JEF United Chiba players
Association football goalkeepers